Alfred Jenkins (15 March 1901 – 28 June 1976) was a New Zealand physical culturist, sports administrator and promoter. He was born in Long Gully, Victoria, Australia on 15 March 1901.

References

1901 births
1976 deaths
People associated with physical culture
People from Victoria (Australia)
Australian emigrants to New Zealand
New Zealand referees and umpires